Tobias Reithmeir (born 13 August 1999) is a German professional footballer who plays as a centre-back for Rot Weiss Ahlen.

Career
In May 2018, Reithmeir signed his first professional contract with 1. FC Heidenheim, lasting one-year until 30 June 2019. He made his professional debut for Heidenheim in the 2. Bundesliga on 10 February 2019, starting in the away match against Darmstadt 98, which finished as a 2–1 win. He left Heidenheim in September 2019 by mutual consent, and joined Austrian 2. Liga side SC Austria Lustenau  in late October on a contract until the end of the season. He returned to Germany on 31 January 2020, joining Regionalliga Südwest side FC Bayern Alzenau, before leaving the club in the summer of 2020.

On 16 May 2020, he signed with another fourth-tier club SV Rödinghausen.

References

External links
 
 

1999 births
Living people
German footballers
Association football central defenders
2. Bundesliga players
2. Liga (Austria) players
Regionalliga players
1. FC Heidenheim players
SC Austria Lustenau players
SV Rödinghausen players
FC Gießen players
Rot Weiss Ahlen players
German expatriate footballers
Expatriate footballers in Austria
German expatriate sportspeople in Austria